Nicole Müller (born 1 March 1980) is a German former footballer who played as a midfielder. She made one appearance for the Germany national team in 1997.

References

External links
 

1980 births
Living people
German women's footballers
Women's association football midfielders
Germany women's international footballers
Place of birth missing (living people)